General Murphy may refer to:

Dennis J. Murphy (born 1932), U.S. Marine Corps major general
Sean L. Murphy (fl. 1980s–2020s), U.S. Air Force major general
Thomas E. Murphy (general) (fl. 1980s–2020s), U.S. Air Force major general
W. R. E. Murphy (1890–1975), Irish National Army major general

See also
Attorney General Murphy (disambiguation)